Operation Exodus may refer to:

 Operation Exodus (WWII operation), an Allied operation to repatriate European prisoners of war to Britain in the Second World War
 Ground Control II: Operation Exodus, a 2004 computer game developed by Massive Entertainment
 Operation Exodus (Louisiana), a plan issued by the Bossier Parish, Louisiana Sheriff's Department for self-sufficiency in case of a disaster
 Operation Exodus, a fundraising campaign to assist in the emigration of Russian Jews during the 1970s.
 Operation Exodus, story by Lan Wright
 Operation Exodus on 2015 Mamasapano clash in the Philippines

See also 
 Exodus (disambiguation)